Ben Crom is a  mountain in the Mourne Mountains in County Down, Northern Ireland. It is situated beside Ben Crom Reservoir, which is upstream from Silent Valley Reservoir. The mountain is composed of  granite. An exposed area on the south west of the mountain shows where the Eocene aplitic granite meets the laccolith top of the older Mesozoic granite ring dike. The summit of the mountain features granite crags which are crossed by basic and feldspar porphyry dikes. The mountain is used for sheep grazing and hill walking.

References

Mountains and hills of County Down
Eocene magmatism
Granite formations